The 2013 Mackay Cutters season was the sixth in the club's history. Coached by Kim Williams and captained by Jardine Bobongie and Joel Clinton, they competed in the QRL's Intrust Super Cup. The club enjoyed their most successful season, finishing the regular season in second place and defeating the Easts Tigers 27–20 in the Grand Final to win their first premiership.

Season summary
After the departure of head coach Anthony Seibold at the end of 2012, the Cutters hired former Melbourne Storm SG Ball Cup coach Kim Williams as his replacement. The club's biggest off-season recruit was former Australian international and NRL premiership winning-prop Joel Clinton, who was returning to Australia after three seasons with Hull Kingston Rovers. He was named co-captain of the club, alongside veteran Jardine Bobongie.

On 28 April 2013, just hours after a 22–22 draw with the Tweed Heads Seagulls, North Queensland Cowboys contracted hooker Alex Elisala was found unconscious and not breathing after jumping from a hotel balcony. He died in hospital the following day. In honour of Elisala, the Cutters retired his number 14 jersey for the rest of the season. Despite the tragedy, the Cutters pushed forward and finished the season in second on the ladder, their highest ever finish (as of the 2019 season). In Week 1 of the finals, they suffered a 18–31 loss to the Easts Tigers before bouncing back to defeat the Ipswich Jets and Northern Pride to qualify for their first Grand Final and set up a rematch with the Tigers.

On 28 September 2013, the Cutters defeated Easts 27–20 in the Grand Final at North Ipswich Reserve to claim their maiden Queensland Cup premiership. Prop Tyson Andrews was named the club's Player of the Year, while Cowboys contracted players, Sam Hoare and Curtis Rona, were selected for the Queensland Residents side.

Squad List

2013 squad

The following players contracted to the North Queensland Cowboys played for the Cutters in 2013: Alex Elisala, Kalifa Faifai Loa, Clint Greenshields, Chris Grevsmuhl, Sam Hoare, Rory Kostjasyn, Tyson Martin, Anthony Mitchell, Michael Morgan, Curtis Rona, Zac Santo, Tariq Sims and Jason Taumalolo.

Squad movement

Gains

Losses

Fixtures

Regular season

Finals

Mackay Cutters' Grand Final winning side: 1 Liam Taylor, 2 Bureta Faraimo, 15 Michael Morgan, 4 Kalifa Faifai Loa, 5 David Milne, 6 Dan Murphy, 7 Matt Minto, 8 Tyson Andrews, 9 Anthony Mitchell, 10 Sam Hoare, 17 Jason Taumalolo, 12 Chris Gesch, 13 Jardine Bobongie (c). Interchange: 11 Dean Webster, 16 Karl Davies, 18 Kelvin Nielsen, 20 Jason Schirnack. Coach: Kim Williams.

Statistics

Honours

Club
Player of the Year: Tyson Andrews
Players' Player: Bureta Faraimo
Sponsor's Player of the Year: Jardine Bobongie
Rookie of the Year: Karl Davies
Club Person of the Year: Chris Fraser

References

2013 in Australian rugby league
2013 in rugby league by club
Mackay Cutters